Edward C. "Mouse" Glenn (September 19, 1860 in Richmond, Virginia – February 10, 1892 in Richmond, Virginia) was a professional baseball outfielder.

Ed, a 5' 10", 160-pound right-handed outfielder, had 555 plate appearances in 137 major league games. He hit .202 with 20 extra-base hits and 29 RBI, but was more widely respected for his dextrous outfield play, smart base running, and steady clubhouse presence. Among his teammates in Richmond and Boston was star third-baseman Billy Nash, another native Richmonder. 

Ed also played for five minor league teams between 1884 and 1890, including the Richmond Virginias/Virginians of the Eastern League; the Syracuse Stars of the International League; the Charleston Quakers and Charleston Seagulls of the Southern League; and the Sioux City Corn Huskers of the Western Association. As a minor-leaguer, he hit .304, with 15 home runs. He also pitched seven innings for Charleston in 1887, giving up eight runs (five earned) on 16 hits. Injuries derailed his career in 1890. 

He began playing in 1879 and eventually signed with the Richmond Virginias, an independent professional club, which became a member of the new minor Eastern League in 1884 (and which, also known as the "Virginians", briefly became a major-league American Association team in August of that year after the demise of the A. A.'s Washington franchise). The Virginias/Virginians returned to a re-formed minor-league Eastern League in 1885. 

His grave is in Richmond's Shockoe Hill Cemetery. His marker gives his actual name, Edward C. Glinn.

External links

1860 births
1892 deaths
Major League Baseball left fielders
Baseball players from Richmond, Virginia
Richmond Virginians players
Pittsburgh Alleghenys players
Kansas City Cowboys players
Boston Beaneaters players
19th-century baseball players
Richmond Virginias players
Richmond Virginians (minor league) players
Syracuse Stars (minor league baseball) players
Charleston Quakers players
Charleston Seagulls players
Sioux City Corn Huskers players